Darien A. Núñez (born March 19, 1993) is a Cuban professional baseball pitcher in the San Francisco Giants organization. He has played in Major League Baseball (MLB) for the Los Angeles Dodgers. The Dodgers signed him as an international free agent in 2018, and made his MLB debut with them in 2021.

Career

Cuban career
Núñez pitched for the Cuban National team in the 2009 World Youth Baseball Championship and at the 2013 World Baseball Classic. Núñez pitched in the Cuban National Series from 2011 through 2015, with a 19–27 record and a 4.00 ERA. He requested his release in 2015 in order to legally play professional baseball. At the time of his release he was considered one of the three best pitchers in the Cuban league.

Los Angeles Dodgers
Núñez was signed by the Los Angeles Dodgers as an international free agent on April 16, 2018. In his professional debut season in 2018, he played in 21 games between the Dominican Summer League Dodgers, the AZL Dodgers, the rookie-level Ogden Raptors, and the Single-A Great Lakes Loons, and had a 2.23 ERA with 57 strikeouts in  innings. He spent most of 2019 with the High-A Rancho Cucamonga Quakes in the California League, pitching to a 1.75 ERA in  innings with 43 strikeouts. Núñez did not play in a game in 2020 due to the cancellation of the minor league season caused by the COVID-19 pandemic. He started the 2021 season with the Double-A Tulsa Drillers, but pitched only one game before a promotion to the Triple-A Oklahoma City Dodgers, where he posted a 2.79 ERA and led the team in strikeout rate (34.2 percent) through the beginning of July.

On July 8, 2021, Núñez was selected to the 40-man roster and called up to the majors for the first time. He made his debut by pitching two innings against the Arizona Diamondbacks on July 9. He allowed two runs (one earned) on one hit (a home run by Eduardo Escobar) while striking out three. His first MLB strikeout was of Daulton Varsho. Núñez pitched  innings for the Dodgers in 2021 over six games (including one appearance as an opener). He was 0–1 with a 8.22 ERA (seven earned runs allowed) while striking out eight, with four walks. He spent the majority of the season with Oklahoma City, where he was 7–0 with a 2.38 ERA in 32 games.

Núñez was assigned to Oklahoma City to start the 2022 season, where he worked  innings in three games, allowing four runs on five hits. After his third appearance he was placed on the minor league injured list and it was announced that he would need to undergo Tommy John surgery, ending his season. The Dodgers designated him for assignment on April 24, removing him from the 40-man roster.

San Francisco Giants
On April 27, 2022, Núñez was claimed off waivers by the San Francisco Giants, but released a couple of days later on April 29. He resigned a minor league deal on May 4, 2022.

References

External links

1993 births
Living people
Expatriate baseball players in the United States
People from Las Tunas (city)
Major League Baseball players from Cuba
Cuban expatriate baseball players in the United States
Major League Baseball pitchers
Los Angeles Dodgers players
Leñadores de Las Tunas players
Cocodrilos de Matanzas players
Vegueros de Pinar del Rio players
Toronjeros de Isla de la Juventud players
Dominican Summer League Dodgers players
Cuban expatriate baseball players in the Dominican Republic
Arizona League Dodgers players
Ogden Raptors players
Great Lakes Loons players
Rancho Cucamonga Quakes players
Atenienses de Manatí (baseball) players
Cuban expatriate baseball players in Puerto Rico
Tulsa Drillers players
Oklahoma City Dodgers players